Robert Wilson (12 February 1935 — April 1987) was a Scottish first-class cricketer.

Wilson was born at Edinburgh in April 1916 and was educated at Paisley Grammar School. A club cricketer for Kelburne Cricket Club, Wilson made his debut for Scotland in first-class cricket against Ireland at Dublin in 1955. He made a further two first-class appearances for Scotland, against Derbyshire in the same year at Edinburgh, and against Yorkshire at Hull on Scotland's 1956 tour of England. Playing as a batsman in the Scottish side, Wilson scored 64 runs as an opening batsman, at an average of 12.80 and a highest score of 29. Wilson died in April 1987 in England at Maidstone, Kent.

References

External links

1935 births
1987 deaths
Sportspeople from Paisley, Renfrewshire
People educated at Paisley Grammar School
Scottish cricketers